Kult ov Azazel is an American black metal band, briefly known as Azazel.

History 
Formed by Xaphan and Xul in 1998, under the name of Azazel, the band released a promo entitled "Forever Heaven Gone" and a MCD entitled "Order of the Fly" in 1999. Azazel then began to play shows in the state of Florida.  After their original drummer was kicked out of the band, Azazel rotated drummers, eventually settling on a drummer known as Hellspawn. In 2000, a split CD was recorded with fellow black metal band Krieg, and the band changed their name to the current moniker, Kult ov Azazel. That same month, they released a promo, entitled "Of Evil and Hatred". They were signed by Arctic Music shortly thereafter.

Hellspawn faded from the band, and Vetis had become their live drummer. The band then set to record, at this time without a drummer, "Triumph of Fire", their first LP. Later in 2001, the band incorporated a permanent drummer, Hammer, and a second guitarist, Nocturath, into their line-up. With this lineup they released "Oculus Infernum" but Nocturath would soon be replaced by VJS whom first appeared with the group in 2004 when they co-headlined the Northern Lights Festival in Toronto, Canada. November of the same year, Kult ov Azazel embarked on The Swarm of Eternal Blackness Tour, a successful West Coast tour and recorded the tracks for the two splits "Feast of Sacrilegious Impurity" and "Through War or Suicide".

In February 2005 the band entered Mana Studios in Tampa Florida and recorded "The World, The Flesh & The Devil" and again booked and completed a successful East Coast tour. In 2006, VJS was replaced by Necrol. As this lineup Kult ov Azazel appeared in 2006 at the Sacrifice of the Nazarene Child 6 Festival, Night of the Black Pentecost and one Ft. Lauderdale, FL show securing the only opening slot for the Celtic Frost "Monotheist" tour.

On September 15, 2007, Kult ov Azazel returned to headline a show in Toronto, Canada and a week later was scheduled to play the Autumn Equinox Festival. Situations arose preventing Xul and Hammer from playing the festival. Instead of cancelling, Xaphan performed with session musicians. This one time lineup included members of Krieg, Engorge, Tenebrous & Malevolent Creation. It was this festival Valac entered the band replacing Necrol as session guitarist.

During the beginning of 2008, a decision was made to take Kult ov Azazel back to its original form keeping the core of the band a 3 piece and utilizing session members for live occasions. Writing for the new album was finalized and in late October 2008 the band entered Mana Studios again to record "Destroying The Sacred". Released June 2, 2009, through Arctic Music the album, as with past releases, has received excellent reviews from both the US magazines/zines as well as international ones.

Support for the album kicked off on July 5, 2009, in Philadelphia when Kult ov Azazel co-headlined the Hostile City Death Festival with Valac as session guitarist. When rehearsing for upcoming shows in October 2009 Kult ov Azazel brought Armanen in to cover guitars for live performances. That same month the band headlined the Milwaukee Blackened Festival and a one off show in Los Angeles, CA on Halloween night. While in Los Angeles Xaphan and Hammer entered Black Static Studios and within a few hours banged out a cover of In League With Satan for a Venom tribute to be released as a split endeavor with Teratism. December 12, 2009, Kult ov Azazel took their blasphemy to the island of Puerto Rico. With this performance the band also made history by being the first national/international black metal to play Puerto Rico. This was filmed to be compiled with other live footage for a future DVD release in 2010.  However, this DVD has never been released.

At the beginning of 2010 the band was hit with Xul's decision to take an indefinite hiatus. With scheduled dates for 2010 already confirmed Xaphan and Hammer were forced to make the decision to make adjustments to the lineup. Armanen was given a permanent position on guitars and former/session member VJS was brought back to play bass. With this lineup Kult ov Azazel embarked on a mini tour billed as the Nihilistic Terror Across Texas headlining the West Texas Death Festival and then joining up for two shows with Teratism and Witchaven. Due to certain circumstances Hammer was unable to do the Texas tour so Tony Laureano (Angel Corpse/Nile/Dimmu Borgir) filled in on drums. Then in May they completed the Nihilistic Terror Across Florida mini tour, having filmed their hometown show for a future DVD release. However, after the Florida shows complications arouse that put the band on complete hold from the month of June until October when the band began rehearsing as a 3 piece with Armanen on bass for their appearance at the Samhain Black Metal Festival MMX in South Carolina. After this festival appearance the band began writing for a new album but again that was put on hold due to the contract with Arctic being up with no renewal.

Fast forward, February 2011 at which time Negativity Records approached the band with interest to release future recordings. With this new offer the flame had been lit again. Since the beginning of March Xaphan has resumed writing with contributions from Armanen, who as of May 2011 has moved to bass guitar and Necrol was back in the band to fill the guitar position.2008-2009 The end months of 2011 were spent writing for "Violators of the Covenant". Also in December 2011 Forbidden Records re-issued the band's first recording "Order Of The Fly: The Ultimate Edition" with new cover art and previously unreleased tracks.

2012 began with Kult ov Azazel co-headlining a show in their hometown of Fort Lauderdale, FL with Cannibal Corpse. Also in January 2012 Negativity Records released the split 7-inch between Kult ov Azazel and Teratism titled "In League With Satan". In February Xaphan was interviewed for the black metal documentary "Out of The Black" and the band announced the addition of Amduscias to handle future guitar/vocal duties. It was announced in June 2012 that Xul had returned to the band. Kult ov Azazel returned to Puerto Rico to headline the Metal Demolition Festival which saw the band playing as a 5 piece with the addition of Armanen back on guitar. By 2013 Xul once again took leave from the band and Amduscias was replaced by former session guitarist Necrol. The bass position was filled by Vastator and Kult ov Azazel continued on as a five piece. With this lineup the band headlined the only show for the year in Miami, FL during the month of October at the first annual Black Kvlt Fest.

The year 2014 was spent on further writing of the new album and more pre-production on it. The band headlines both Wrath of the Goat III & IV with Archangel Sin Scythe (Led By Serpents/Element Of Eclipse) filling in on drums for the WotG III Festival in Wilkes-Barre, PA and with Paul Collier (ex-Angel Corpse) filling in drums for the WotG IV held in Chicago, IL. In October 2014 Kult ov Azazel announce that Hag (ex-Pact) had joined the band as vocalist.

On January 1, 2016, Kult ov Azazel revealed a new pre-production demo track of "Corpus Edimus, Sanguinem Bibimus" on their Facebook page. The pre-pro demo track featured a guest solo by Phil Fasciana of Malevolent Creation. At this time, the band has half of the album recorded as a pre-production demo and continues to forge forward with the pre-production recordings. "Violators of the Covenant" will be the first album recorded with the new lineup and will be the first recording appearances of Hag (vocals), Necrol (guitar), Armanen (bass), along with longtime members Xaphan (guitar/vocals) and Hammer (drums). The album will be recorded and produced by the band at S.B.S. Studio in Fort Lauderdale, FL and will include ten tracks. Once the pre-pro demo is finished a three-song demo will be shopped around to labels for a deal.

Members
Current members
 Xaphan - guitars, vocals (1998–present)
 Hammer - drums (2001–present)
 Armanen - bass (2010-2012, 2015–present), guitars (2009-2010, 2012–2015)
 Necrol - guitars (2006–2007, 2011–present)
 Hag - vocals (2014-2017, 2018–present)

Past members
 Xul - vocals, bass (1998–2009, 2012)
 Von - drums (1998)
 Hellspawn - drums (1999–2000)
 Nocturath (Open Grave, Helcaraxë, Minas Tirith) - guitars (2001–2003)
 Amduscias - guitars, vocals (2012)
 Vastator - bass (2013-2015)

Past Live Session members
 Vetis (Sickness/Malevolent Creation) - drums (2000–2001), drums (2010, March Metal Massacre V)
 Imperial (Krieg) - vocals (2007, Autumn Equinox Festival)
 MCoken (Engorge) - bass (2007, Autumn Equinox Festival)
 Valac (Malevolent Creation/Divine Empire/Against the Plagues) - guitars (2007–2009)
 VJS (Demoncy/Incursus/Tenebrous/Goreaphobia/Crimson Moon/Nightbringer) - guitars (2004–2005), drums (2007, Autumn Equinox Festival), drums (2009, Hostile City Death Festival), bass (2010)
 Tony Laureano (Angelcorpse/Nile/Dimmu Borgir/1349/Acheron/Brujeria/God Dethroned/Belphegor/Nachtmystium/Insidious Disease) - drums (2010, Nihilistic Terror Across Texas Tour)
 Archangel Sin Scythe (Led By Serpents/Element Of Eclipse) - drums (2014, Wrath of The Goat III Festival)
 Paul Collier (Angelcorpse/Ornament of Disgrace/Pessimist/Fistula) - drums (2014, Wrath of The Goat IV Festival and the 2016 Archons ov Darkness Tour)
 Azagkur - drums (2015, Reich ov Khaos mini-tour)

Timeline

Discography
Studio albums
 Triumph of Fire (2001)
 Order of the Fly (2002)
 Oculus Infernum (2003)
 The World, The Flesh, & The Devil (2005)
 Destroying The Sacred (2009)

Demos, EPs, and Splits
 Forever Heaven Gone (as Azazel) (1999)
 Order of the Fly (as Azazel) (1999)
 Of Evil and Hatred (2000)
 Gather Against Humanity (Split w/ Obitus, Humanicide, and ThyLord) (2001)
 Kult Ov Azazel/Krieg (Split w/ Krieg) (2001)
 Satan's Blood/Kult ov Azazel (Split EP w/ Satan's Blood) (2003)		
 Grandaevus Dæmonum (2003)
 Through War or Suicide (Split w/ Horn of Valere) (2005)
 Feast of Sacrilegious Impurity (Split w/ Vrolok) (2006)
 In League With Satan (Split w/ Teratism) (2012)
 Luciferian Vengeance (2016)
 The Dawn of Luciferian Enlightenment (2017)

Compilations
 American Black Metal Assault (Infinite Darkness Records, 2000)
 Visionaries of the Macarbe Volume 2: An Evil Elite (Lost Disciple Records,2000)
 Casting Eternal Fires Volume 1 (Spectral Arts Productions, 2002)
 Jesus Wept/Black Arts No. 1 (Black Arts Productions, 2002)
 Jesus Wept/Black Arts No. 2 (Black Arts Productions, 2003)
 Thanatos Volume 1: Between The Bloodstained Lines of Time (Lookinglassblack, 2003)
 Black Mass Consecration (2004)
 Destroyers From The Western Skies (As Night Devours The Sun) (Killzone Records, 2005)

Live album
 Assaulting the Masses (2003)

External links

1998 establishments in Florida
American black metal musical groups
Heavy metal musical groups from Florida
Musical groups from Fort Lauderdale, Florida
Musical quintets